Thirumangalam metro station is a Metro railway station on the Line 2 of the Chennai Metro. The station is among the underground stations coming up along corridor II of the Chennai Metro through Anna Nagar stretch. The station will serve the neighbourhoods where the old village of Thirumangalam once stood and now the area where the Thirumangalam Flyover, a prominent landmark and referred to by residents when giving directions.

Construction history

The station is being constructed by the Consolidated Constructed Consortium (CCCL). The station was opened for public on May 14, 2017.

The station
The station is being constructed as an underground station near Koyambedu. The station has a capacity to handle about 23,000 passengers an hour. The station has four entry and exit points.

Traffic
As of December 2019, about 10,000 passengers board trains at the station, making it the busiest metro station in Chennai.

Underground Station layout

Elevated Station layout

Facilities
List of available ATM at Thirumangalam metro station are

Connections
Metropolitan Transport Corporation (Chennai) bus routes number 7E, 7F, 7H, 7K, 7M, 7MET, 15C, 34, 40A, 40H, 40L, 40N, 41D, 47C, 47CX, 47D, 47J, 147A, 147B, 147C, 147V, A47 serve the station.  Also Share Autos serve the station.

Entry/Exit
There are four entry exits. All are on second Avenue. The exits in the left side while traveling towards airport or Koyambedu is best suited for reaching Tirumangalam, Mogappair, Padi, Koyambedu. Additionally, Lalitha and GRT jewellers are in the same side.

See also

 List of Chennai metro stations
 Chennai Metro
 Railway stations in Chennai
 Chennai Mass Rapid Transit System
 Chennai Monorail
 Chennai Suburban Railway
 Transport in Chennai
 List of metro systems in India
 List of rapid transit systems in India
 List of metro systems

References

External links
 

 UrbanRail.Net – descriptions of all metro systems in the world, each with a schematic map showing all stations.

Chennai Metro stations
Railway stations in Chennai